Lincoln is an unincorporated community in Jackson Township, Cass County, Indiana.

History
Lincoln had its start in the year 1852 by the building of the railroad through that territory. It was named for its founder, Theodore Lincoln. A post office was established at Lincoln in 1855, and remained in operation until it was discontinued in 1953.

Geography

References

External links

Unincorporated communities in Cass County, Indiana
Unincorporated communities in Indiana
1852 establishments in Indiana
Populated places established in 1852